Cattle judging is the process of judging a series of cattle and pronouncing a first-, second- and third-place animal based on each animal's individual traits compared to that of the others. Most cattle judging occurs in show rings at agricultural shows and livestock shows.

Judgments on cattle are ultimately based on which animal is worth the most profit.

There are many fine points to cattle judging. In a beef animal, for example, it is desirable to have a large animal with muscle development.

See also
Livestock show

External links 
Judging Etiquette (University of Missouri)
University of Kentucky Agripedia entry on livestock judging
Sample Cattle Judging Classes at LivestockJudging.com

References

Cattle
Animal shows